BioFach is the world's largest trade fair for organic food and agriculture. It is held each year in the month of February, in Nuremberg, Germany. It brings together 2774 exhibitors and approximately 46700 trade visitors from around 130 countries.

References

Trade fairs in Germany
Agriculture in Germany
Nuremberg